Ghost Tapes #10 is the ninth studio album by Irish post-rock band God Is an Astronaut. It was released in February 2021 through Napalm Records.

Track listing

Critical reception
Ghost Tapes #10 was released to positive critical reception. Tim Peacock, writing for Dead Press, gave it an 8/10, calling it a "deeply intense record", though he considered parts of the album repetitive. Jay H. Gorania for Blabbermouth.net held the album in high regard, awarding a 9/10 score. Gorania described the album's quality as being "jaw-dropping", capable of making listeners forget about the lack of vocals. Max Morin of Metal Injection was less impressed. Morin gave the album a 7/10 but noted that the album was not adventurous for the band, but that it would please fans.

References

2021 albums
God Is an Astronaut albums